Kelty railway station served the village of Kelty, Fife, Scotland from 1860 to 1930 on the Kinross-shire Railway.

History 
The station opened on 20 June 1860 by the North British Railway. It had a goods building at one point in its existence. The station closed to passengers on 22 September 1930.

References 

Disused railway stations in Fife
Former North British Railway stations
Railway stations in Great Britain opened in 1860
Railway stations in Great Britain closed in 1930
1860 establishments in Scotland
1930 disestablishments in Scotland